Christopher Francis Fox (Chris Fox) (born 27 September 1957) is a British Liberal Democrat politician. He was made life peer as Baron Fox, of Leominster in the County of Herefordshire, on 11 September 2014.

He graduated with a BSc in chemistry from Imperial College London. Fox spent a year as president of the Imperial College Students' Union.

As of June 2017 he was appointed Liberal Democrat Lords Spokesperson for Business, Energy and Industrial Strategy in the House of Lords. From June 2015 he was a member of the Lords Science and Technology Committee, in July 2019 changing to be a member of the Economic Affairs Committee.

In May 2020 The Daily Telegraph reported that Fox had furloughed himself under the government financed COVID support scheme in his single employee company, Vulpes Advisory, which had a £100,000 cash balance, as well as claiming his £162 daily allowance for Lords Zoom video meetings attendance. The newspaper critically characterised this as a "double dip into the taxpayers' pocket", and some MPs said this was "milking the taxpayer". Fox apologised for his "error in judgment" and promised to repay the furlough money.

References

External links 
Lord Fox – UK Parliament

1957 births
Living people
Alumni of Imperial College London
Liberal Democrats (UK) life peers
People from Haslemere
Life peers created by Elizabeth II